The following is a list of environmental podcasts that focus on environmentalism, sustainability, climate change, and pollution.

List

See also 
Popular science
Environmental journalism

References 

environmental
Climate change
Environmentalism
Sustainability
Pollution
Green politics
Environment-related lists